Dodge produced three separate models with the name Dodge Charger Daytona, all of which were modified Dodge Chargers. The name was taken from Daytona Beach, Florida, which was an early center for auto racing and still hosts the Daytona 500, NASCAR's premier event. The original Dodge Charger Daytona was designed to beat the competition in NASCAR racing. It was the first NASCAR vehicle to reach 200 miles per hour, which was a major milestone at the time.

The first use of the 'Daytona' name for a car was on a version of the Studebaker Lark. The Daytona was the performance model of the compact Lark, and it was produced during the 1960s.

1969

With the racing failure of the previous limited edition 1968 Dodge Charger 500 in NASCAR and Plymouth's superstar Richard Petty leaving them for Ford, the 1969 Dodge Charger Daytona was created. It was intended to be a high-performance, limited-edition version of the Dodge Charger produced in the summer of 1969 for the sole purpose of winning high-profile NASCAR races. It won its first race, the inaugural Talladega 500, in the fall, although the top names had left the track on Saturday in a boycott of the race. Buddy Baker, in the No. 99 Chrysler Engineering Dodge Charger Daytona, was the first driver in NASCAR history to break the  mark, on March 24, 1970, at Talladega. The 1969 Dodge Daytona won two races in 1969 and another four in 1970, for a total of six. Its successor, the 1970 Plymouth Superbird, won eight races – all in 1970. Dodge Daytonas also won on the USAC and ARCA race circuits. They set numerous race and pole records.

One of the two famous aero-cars, the Dodge Daytona had featured special body modifications that included a  stabilizer wing on the rear deck, a special sheet-metal "nose cone" that replaced the traditional upright front grille, a flush rear backlight (rear window area), a 'window cap' to cover the original Charger's recessed rear window, specific front fenders and hood that were modeled after the upcoming 1970 Charger, stainless steel A-pillar covers and fender mounted cooling scoops. The Daytona was built on the 1969 Charger's R/T trim specifications, meaning that it carried a heavy-duty suspension and brake setup and was equipped with a  Magnum engine as standard. Of special note to collectors is the optional  Hemi V8 engine, which only 70 of the 503 Daytonas carried. It had a corporate cousin in the "one year-only" 1970 Plymouth Superbird and with help of Chrysler's missile engineers, the Charger Daytona was born.

The "Winged Warriors", as they were affectionately known, did not compete for long in NASCAR's top Cup series. On the next season of NASCAR, the executives banned aero specs on cars with engines bigger than 305 cubic inches (i.e. the same five litre limit imposed by the SCCA for the Trans-Am and internationally by the FIA for Group 5 sports cars). Because of their exceptional speed and performance, NASCAR subsequently changed the rule book, effectively banning all four of the Aero Cars from Dodge, Ford, Mercury, and Plymouth from competition by the end of 1970. See also Plymouth Superbird, Ford Torino Talladega and Mercury Cyclone Spoiler II for additional information about the aero cars. The 1970 Daytona 500 had only one winged car, the #22 called "mini motor."

The Dodge Daytona is now a very valuable collectible, with 440-powered Daytonas reaching into six-figure territory and 426 hemi-engined cars passing the $900,000 mark. The "Super Charger IV EL", which looked like a roadster prototype spin-off of the Charger Daytona minus the roof and spoiler, is seen as a pimp-mobile in the 1974 film Truck Turner. The car was actually a Charger show car, with a front end of a Daytona mounted onto it. Foot note: These 503 cars were actually Charger 500's as they rolled off the assembly line. Dodge shipped them to an offsite fabricator (not employees of Dodge), who transformed these by mounting the wing, supports in trunk and the front nose cone.

1975–1977
For 1975–77, the Daytona name returned on the Charger, which by this time was a re-badged Chrysler Cordoba.  The Daytona package of this era, was a 2-tone stripe-and-decal appearance package. A 400 c.i. big block engine could be ordered as the 318 was standard. In addition some models (very few) were equipped with a tachometer. All Daytonas came with torsion bar heavy duty suspension. And to compete against the Cordoba, they could be ordered with luxury appointments.  
Although this car was a product of the times, this was the first true Daytona produced on the assembly line. The winged cars were actually Charger 500's sent to a custom fabrication business called Creative Industries, for installation of the wing, supports and  the nose cone. Cars of this era are extremely rare as their numbers were very low and the automakers were buying cheap steel from overseas.  A Good number of these cars were junked due to rust issues.
These cars like their predecessor were slow to move off showroom floors. Not because of their appearance, but because of heavy, gas guzzling cars of the time. With gas prices increasing, America was looking for more economical cars.

2006–2009

The Dodge Charger was reintroduced for 2006 with a limited production Dodge Charger Daytona package that included a sportier interior, classic high impact exterior colors, a rear spoiler, a front chin spoiler, a blacked out grille surround, rear quarter panel striping reading "DAYTONA" on either side, a blackout vinyl between the taillights on the decklid, and a black vinyl on the hood with the word "HEMI" cut out twice. Heritage R/T badges replaced the Stock R/T's chrome badges. A performance suspension with load-leveling rear shocks was also standard, as well as unique wheels. 2006 wheels were the stock R/T 18" wheels with charcoal grey painted pockets, and lower profile wider tires. 2007 to 2009 wheels are 20" chrome clad wheels. In 2008, the rear quarter panel stripes were removed, and replaced with a strobe stripe on the lower portions of the doors that reads "DAYTONA" towards the front of the stripe. The hood decal was also modified. The 2006–2008 Daytona gains  over the standard Charger R/T via a freer flowing exhaust system featuring a single pass center muffler, and a larger diameter stock air cleaner giving it 350 hp. The car also had unique engine management software that removed the stock R/T speed limiter.  The 2009 features the new Variable Camshaft Timing HEMI, producing .  These are the First Daytona's to wear a badge listing the number it was produced out of total production numbers

2013

The 2013 Dodge Charger Daytona debuted at the 2012 Los Angeles International Auto Show as the re-introduction of the legendary Dodge Charger Daytona. Available in Charger R/T and Charger R/T Road & Track trim levels, the 2013 Dodge Charger Daytona brought back the unique style of the historic Daytona package with all the modern performance and technology offered in the 2013 Charger line-up. Only 3,000 units of the Daytona were produced in this limited-production run.

"With its 370-horsepower HEMI V-8, rear-wheel drive and iconic design, the 2013 Dodge Charger is a modern-day muscle car, and the new Dodge Charger Daytona takes it to a new level by paying homage to the historic 'Daytona' nameplate," said Reid Bigland, President and CEO, Dodge Brand. "It starts with a legendary HEMI underfoot and one-of-a-kind interior and exterior styling enhancements that perfectly combine heritage, performance and value, starting under $33,000 MSRP."

Available in a unique color palette of Daytona Blue, Bright White, Billet Silver, Pitch Black, or purple the Daytona package featured special dark trim that built upon the Charger's iconic muscle car design. Satin Black adorned the front crosshair grille with heritage "R/T" badge, the custom vinyl hood graphic, roof wrap, rear R/T spoiler and the "DAYTONA" graphic on the rear quarter panels. It featured exclusive 20-inch five-spoke polished aluminum wheels with Gloss Black painted pockets.

Models also included a 'Daytona Blue' engine cover, performance 3.06 rear axle ratio, high-speed engine controller, paddle shifters with sport mode and performance steering and suspension.

The Dodge Charger Daytona's interior on the Road & Track featured unique black performance Nappa leather and suede heated and ventilated seats with Daytona Blue stitching and piping. Similarly, the Daytona on the R/T offered the same appearance in a custom sport cloth seat. "DAYTONA" was embroidered in blue into the upper front seat backs. Unique dark brushed aluminum trim surrounded the 8.4-inch Uconnect Touch screen and gauges on the instrument panel, as well as the trim around the shifter and cup holders on the center console. Finishing touches included a Mopar bright pedal kit, a 552-watt 10-speaker Beats Audio System, and a special numbered "DAYTONA" badge on the instrument panel that featured the build number of that specific Dodge Charger Daytona model.

The Manufacturer's Suggested Retail Price (MSRP) was $32,990 for R/T and $36,495 for R/T Road & Track Daytona models.

2017/2020

The new 2017 Dodge Charger Daytona and Daytona 392 was unveiled in August 2016. In the US market, where it is most popular, it features a choice of either a 5.7 Liter or 6.4 Liter V8. In Canada however, the Dodge Charger Daytona is only available with the 5.7 Liter V8. The Daytona and Daytona 392 trim will also include the upgrades from the Super Track Pack(Sport Suspension, Custom Brake linings, and Goodyear Eagle F1 Tires). The car will be available for order starting in October 2016.  Unlike the 2013 Daytona, the 2017 vehicles are not numbered.  Insurance inquiry into a Daytona VIN shows the vehicle as a "2017 Dodge Charger Scat Pack 392".  The Scat Pack is the R/T with the 392 c.i. engine.  The Daytona is a package option on the Scat Pack.

The 2020 Daytona gets the 717-hp version of the standard Hellcat engine and is limited to 501 units.

Production

In popular culture
A Daytona appeared in the 2013 film Fast & Furious 6, driven by the character Dominic Torretto (Vin Diesel). In the film, it is said to have been an original 1969 model that had been modified into a pro touring super car, and is heavily damaged in the film's climax. The vehicles used in filming were actually standard model Chargers, modified to resemble the Daytona. To perform the driving stunts in the film, the cars were fitted with Chevrolet racing engines, most likely the 572 cid.

The Daytona also appeared in the 2001 film Joe Dirt, where it is driven by the titular character. The vehicle in the film is run down and damaged, sporting only one working light and with mismatched paint on its body. Joe Dirt accidentally damages it further by driving the car into a parking lot as a barrier is coming down, removing the vehicle's spoiler in the process.

A blue model appears in the music video for the 1996 Spice Girls single "Say You'll Be There".

A Daytona appears in the 2009 video game Left 4 Dead 2. The Daytona, driven by the fictional Jimmy Gibbs Jr., is taken by the survivors to drive to New Orleans. However, a blocked freeway seen at the start of Dark Carnival forces the survivors to ditch the car.

The Daytona appears in Grand Theft Auto online; the car is referred to as the "Gauntlet Classic custom" and can only be obtained by upgrading the Gauntlet Classic at a custom garage.

See also
 Dodge Charger 500
 Plymouth Superbird
 Ford Torino Talladega

References

External links
 Allpar Dodge NASCAR Development – extensive history of Charger Daytona development

Charger Daytona
Rear-wheel-drive vehicles
Muscle cars
Full-size vehicles
Coupés
Sedans
1960s cars
1970s cars
2000s cars